Midnight Awake is the title of the eighth solo album by British singer-songwriter Adrian Snell.

Track listing

Side one
 "Who's Laughing Now" (Adrian Snell/Tom Douglas)
 "Still Your Heart" (Adrian Snell/Tom Douglas)
 "Light on the Road" (Adrian Snell/Phil Thomson)
 "Rejoice" (Adrian Snell/Tom Douglas)
 "Shelter From the Storm" (Adrian Snell)

Side two
 "Start Over" (Adrian Snell/Tom Douglas)
 "Heart of the Father" (Adrian Snell/Tom Douglas)
 "Come in From the World" (Adrian Snell/Phil Thomson)
 "Midnight Awake" (Adrian Snell/Barry Crompton)
 "Fill My Life" (Adrian Snell/Tom Douglas)

Personnel
Adrian Snell: Vocals, Keyboards and Synthesizer
Joe English: Drums
Tim Smith: Bass and Backing vocals
John Lawry: Keyboards and Synthesizer
George Cocchini: Guitar
Norman Barratt: Guitar
Terry Rowley: Guitar
Alician McInnes: Backing vocals
Mo Stanway: Backing vocals
Barry Crompton: Backing vocals
Tom Douglas: Backing vocals
John Pac: Backing vocals
Donnie Sanders: Saxophone

Production notes
Produced by Ray Nenow
Executive producer John Pac
Engineered by Joe Wilson, Colin Owen and Terry Rowley
Mixed by Bob Clark
String arrangements by Tim Smith
Arrangements by Tim Smith and John Lawry

1983 albums